Atacazo is a volcano of the Western Cordillera located 25 kilometers southwest of Quito, Ecuador. Atacazo is a stratovolcano formed by the action of a Late-Pleistocene to Holocene caldera. 
The last eruption of the Atacazo was nearly 2300 years ago.

See also

Lists of volcanoes
List of volcanoes in Ecuador

References

Stratovolcanoes of Ecuador
Four-thousanders of the Andes
Pleistocene stratovolcanoes
Holocene stratovolcanoes
Pleistocene calderas
Holocene calderas